Oenopota magellanica is a species of sea snail, a marine gastropod mollusk in the family Mangeliidae.

Description
The length of the shell attains 7 mm.

Distribution
This marine species occurs off Rio Grande do Sul, Brazil and off Argentina.

References

 Martens, E. von. "Mehrere von Sr. Maj. Schiff Gazelle von der Magalhaenstrasse, der Ostküste Patagoniens un der Kerguelen-Insel mitgebrachte Meeres-Conchylien." Sitzungs-Berichte der Gesellschaft Naturforschender Freunde zu Berlin 1881 (1881): 75–80.

External links
 
 Forcelli (2000), Molluscos Magallanicos: Mangelia magellanica

magellanica
Gastropods described in 1881